

256001–256100 

|-bgcolor=#f2f2f2
| colspan=4 align=center | 
|}

256101–256200 

|-bgcolor=#f2f2f2
| colspan=4 align=center | 
|}

256201–256300 

|-bgcolor=#f2f2f2
| colspan=4 align=center | 
|}

256301–256400 

|-id=369
| 256369 Vilain ||  || Christiane Vilain (born 1949), a retired researcher and teacher of physics and the history of physics || 
|-id=374
| 256374 Danielpequignot ||  || Daniel Pequignot (born 1945), an astronomer at Paris Observatory || 
|}

256401–256500 

|-bgcolor=#f2f2f2
| colspan=4 align=center | 
|}

256501–256600 

|-id=537
| 256537 Zahn ||  ||  (born 1935), a French astrophysicist, specialist in fluid dynamics and internal structure of stars || 
|-id=547
| 256547 Davidesmith ||  || David E. Smith (born 1934), a planetary scientist and principal investigator of the Mars Global Surveyor's MOLA, the Lunar Reconnaissance Orbiter's LOLA, and MESSENGERs MLA instruments || 
|}

256601–256700 

|-id=697
| 256697 Nahapetov ||  || Rodion Nakhapetov (born 1944), a Ukrainian-born, Russian actor, film director, screenwriter and an awarded People's Artist of Russia || 
|-id=698
| 256698 Zhuzhixin ||  || Zhu Zhixin (1885–1920) was an activist, writer and polemicist who lived in the late Qing to early Republic of China era. The Zhixin High School in Guangzhou, founded in 1921, was established in his memory. || 
|-id=699
| 256699 Poudai ||  || The Chinese town of Poudai, on Hainan Island || 
|}

256701–256800 

|-id=795
| 256795 Suzyzahn ||  || Suzy Collin-Zahn (born 1938), a specialist of quasars and Active Nuclei of Galaxies. || 
|-id=796
| 256796 Almanzor ||  || Pico Almanzor (2592 m) in the Sierra de Gredos, the highest mountain in central Spain || 
|-id=797
| 256797 Benbow ||  || Admiral Benbow Inn, the fictional home of Jim Hawkins in Robert Louis Stevenson's 1883 novel "Treasure Island". || 
|}

256801–256900 

|-id=813
| 256813 Marburg ||  || Marburg, a city in central Germany || 
|-id=892
| 256892 Wutayou ||  || Wu Ta-You (1907–2000), a Chinese atomic and nuclear theoretical physicist who introduced modern physics to China || 
|}

256901–257000 

|-bgcolor=#f2f2f2
| colspan=4 align=center | 
|}

References 

256001-257000